Sergeant Christopher James Shannon   (born 1899, date of death unknown) was an English First World War flying ace credited with five aerial victories.

In 1917 Shannon was serving in No. 22 Squadron RFC, flying as an observer/gunner in the Bristol F.2b two-seater fighter. His first aerial victory came 21 August 1917 with pilot Lieutenant T. W. Martin, driving down out of control a Fokker D.VII north of Cambrai. His subsequent victories were gained with pilot Lieutenant Frank George Gibbons. He destroyed two D.VIIs over Haynecourt on 2 September, drove down another D.VII over Quesnoy Wood on 16 September, and drove down his fifth and final D.VII between Sensée Canal and Cambrai on 27 September.

On 31 December 1918 Shannon was awarded the Distinguished Flying Medal.

References

1899 births
Year of death missing
People from Stamford Hill
Royal Flying Corps soldiers
British World War I flying aces
Recipients of the Distinguished Flying Medal
Military personnel from London
Royal Air Force personnel of World War I